The fibrous pericardium is attached to the posterior surface of the sternum by the superior and inferior sternopericardiac ligaments (sternopericardial ligaments); the upper passing to the manubrium, and the lower to the xiphoid process.

References

External links

Cardiac anatomy